A list of films produced in France in 2005.

External links
 2005 in France
 2005 in French television
 French films of 2005 at the Internet Movie Database
French films of 2005 at Cinema-francais.fr

2005
Films
French